The 1921 Iowa State Cyclones football team represented Iowa State College of Agricultural and Mechanic Arts (later renamed Iowa State University) in the Missouri Valley Conference during the 1921 college football season. In their first and only season under head coach Maury Kent, the Cyclones compiled a 4–4 record (3–4 against conference opponents), finished in sixth place in the conference, and outscored opponents by a combined total of 87 to 74. They played their home games at State Field in Ames, Iowa. Polly Wallace was the team captain.

Schedule

References

Iowa State
Iowa State Cyclones football seasons
Iowa State Cyclones football